Dee D. Jackson (born Deirdre Elaine Cozier, 15 July 1954, Oxford, England) is an English singer and musician. In the 1970s, she worked as a film producer in Munich, Germany, before moving into music, working with Giorgio Moroder, Jimmy McShane and Keith Forsey.

Career
After years working for other artists, Jackson released her first single in 1977, "Man of a Man", which has not been included in any of her albums. The single did not get the public's attention. Her next attempt was the release of her biggest single, "Automatic Lover" in 1978, which reached No. 4 on the UK Singles Chart. In Germany, the single reached No. 5. It also climbed high up the South African singles charts. In Brazil, the success was such that the Brazilian media produced its own version of Dee D. Jackson. A Brazilian girl (Regina Shakti, who later became a spiritual yoga and physical therapist) dressed like Jackson, and along with her robot and a meteor man, were introduced on TV programs there as the real Dee D. Jackson. Shakti was introduced as "D. Dee Jackson" to avoid problems with royalties.

In 1976, Jackson married and had a baby boy named Norman.

In 1978, she released her first album Cosmic Curves, a science fiction/disco LP, produced by Gary Unwin and his wife Patty. The second single from Cosmic Curves was released later that year, and "Meteor Man" was a hit in Argentina, Brazil, Europe and Japan. More modest airplay saw it reach No. 48 on the UK Singles Chart.

The following year, Jackson released another single, "Fireball". It failed to feature in the UK chart, but enjoyed reasonable airplay in Italy, Germany, Brazil and Argentina. After months of exhaustive promotion, travel, and TV appearances, Jackson spent two years before recording a new album.

This album, Thunder & Lightning, was released at the end of 1980. In Italy, it was released under the name The Fantastic with a different album cover. The first single "SOS (Love to the Rescue)" failed again in the UK, but once more France, Brazil, Italy, Argentina, Japan and Germany reacted more positively.

In the early 1980s, Jackson moved to Los Angeles, California and, in 1981, a greatest hits album called Profile was released in Germany. But after spending only months living in the US, she relocated to Italy and subsequently released the Italo disco/space disco singles "Talk Me Down" (1981), "Shotgun" (1982), "Moonlight Starlight" (1984), "Sweet Carillon" (1984) and "Heat of the Night" (1985). In 1988, "Automatic Lover" was remixed by Michael Cretu (Enigma), and released as a single entitled "Automatic Lover 88 Digital Max Mix", another hit in Japan.

A new album Blame It on the Rain was issued in 1995, with the attendant single release "People". She is currently married and living in Turin, Italy, where she owns a record company, DDE Records Ltd.

Since 1996, Jackson has written songs and produced for other musicians. With the duo Nylon Moon, Jackson wrote the lyrics and melody and sang backing vocals on the track "Poppy Fields". Another track, "Maybe My Day", was included in the soundtrack of La Stanza del figlio.

Discography

Albums
Cosmic Curves (1978) - AUS #79
Thunder & Lightning (1980)
Blame It on the Rain (1995)
Space and Time (2010)

Compilation albums
Profile (1981)
Il Meglio (1998)
Starlight – The Ultimate Collection (2012)

Singles

References

External links
 Dee D. Jackson website
 Dee D. Jackson fansite 
 
 Dee D. Jackson Photo Gallery

1954 births
Living people
English women singers
People from Oxford
British Italo disco musicians